TREKOL is a Moscow, Russia based designer and manufacturer of large all terrain amphibious vehicles/swamp buggies. Trekol is an abbreviation for «ТРанспорт ЭКОЛогический» or Transport Environmentally. TREKOL is a Limited liability company ( (OOO)).

Products

Trekol manufactures the following wheeled ATV's
 TREKOL Trophy - 4x4 based on UAZ 2206
 TREKOL-39294 - 6x6 with a fiberglass body
 TREKOL-39295 -6x6 pickup truck with a fiberglass body
 TREKOL-39041 - 4x4 based on the UAZ-31514
 TREKOL-39445 - fiberglass body 4x4 based on rebodied UAZ Hunter
 TREKOL-39446 - fiberglass body pickup truck variant of 39445
 TREKOL-AGRO - 4x4 fitted with agricultural equipment
 TREKOL-Forester-D (LIGHT) - 4x4 open body 
 TREKOL-Woodman - 4x4
 TREKOL Forester-M - large 4x4 
 TREKOL Forester-M North - large 4x4 for Arctic use
 TREKOL 8901-trailer - single axle trailer 
 TREKOL Ambulance - 6x6 ambulance on 39294 base

References

External links
 Official page

Truck manufacturers of Russia
Car manufacturers of Russia
Russian brands
Companies based in Moscow Oblast